Anand Ashok Chand Burman (born 1952) is an Indian billionaire businessman, and chairman of Dabur a leading consumer goods company. With a net worth of $5.8 billion, he is among the Top 20 richest Indians and on the Forbes list.

Early life 
Burman was born in Kolkata in 1952, in a Punjabi Khatri business family. His father was Ashok Chand Burman, chairman emeritus of Dabur. He finished his initial school education at St. Paul's School in Darjeeling, India. Burman completed his bachelor's degree in chemistry from the University of Wisconsin and his master's degree and a doctorate in pharmaceutical chemistry, both from the University of Kansas.

Dabur
Anand joined the family business Dabur as manager of the research and development department in 1980. He came on the company's board in 1986 and became chairman in 2007.

Other associations 
Anand is the co-founder of Asian healthcare fund and serves on the board of directors for 33 companies including Hero Motocorp, Aviva Life Insurance, Ester Industries, Interx Laboratories. He has served as the chairman of Fresenius Kabi Oncology Ltd and an independent non-executive director of Hindustan Motors Ltd. Anand started a non-profit organisation Sundesh working for healthcare, education.

Awards and recognitions 
One of 14 finalists from India in EY Entrepreneur of the Year 2011
Camden FB Top 50 family business leaders 2013
Business Leader of the Year Award at The Asian Awards, 2019

Personal life 
Anand is married to Minnie, and they have two children, son Aditya, and daughter Anisha.

References

1950s births
Living people
Indian billionaires
Indian industrialists
University of Wisconsin–Madison College of Letters and Science alumni
University of Kansas alumni
St. Paul's School, Darjeeling alumni
Businesspeople from Kolkata
Punjabi people